Nuño Álvarez may refer to:

Nuño Álvarez de Carazo (fl. 1028–54), Castilian diplomat
Nuno Álvares Pereira (1360–1431), Portuguese general